The Ohio Resource Center (ORC) for mathematics, science and reading, a project of the State University Education Deans, has been funded by the Ohio General Assembly and established by the Ohio Board of Regents to:
Identify effective instructional and professional development resources and best practices and disseminate them to schools, school districts and higher education institutions.
Support sustained professional development for teachers and administrators in the effective adoption of best practices and teaching resources.
Foster an integrated educational research and development capacity for Ohio through collaboration with colleges and universities involved in teacher preparation.

The role of the ORC is to identify best practices, to disseminate this information to a wide variety of user audiences, and then to assist with implementing, institutionalizing and sustaining these pre-K to 12 practices across the Ohio educational system. ORC uses proposal processes and subcontracts with two- and four-year higher education institutions and other pre- K to 12 education providers for aggregating best practices information, developing interactive data and knowledge bases, disseminating best practices information, and conducting applied research on needed areas critical to the state educational system. Best practices determined through ORC represent a variety of practices, suitable for different purposes and for different audiences, but certified through a peer-review process that assures the validity of each practice for its intended purpose. ORC also makes important contributions to communication with public and business stakeholders of education and to the expansion of the knowledge and databases for informing educational policy.

The ORC provides links to peer-reviewed instructional resources that have been identified by a panel of Ohio educators as exemplifying best or promising practice. Available resources also include content and professional resources as well as assessment and general education resources that will support the work of pre-K to 12 classroom teachers and higher education faculty members. The resources are correlated with Ohio's academic content standards and with applicable national content standards.

The administrative site for the ORC is located in and administered through the College of Education and Human Ecology of the Ohio State University. Many two- and four-year public and private higher education institutions and several other agencies are involved in the design of ORC's structure, the development of its products, and the delivery of its services. ORC operates primarily as a virtual best practice center, with working groups and research teams drawn from faculty at Ohio colleges and universities in cooperation with schools and school districts across the state. ORC's resources are available primarily via the web and are coordinated with other state and regional efforts to improve student achievement and teacher effectiveness in pre-K to 12 mathematics, science and reading. The website is organized around Ohio's academic content standards.

External links
 ORC website

Buildings and structures in Columbus, Ohio